This is a list of the National Register of Historic Places listings in Schleicher County, Texas.

This is intended to be a complete list of properties and districts listed on the National Register of Historic Places in Schleicher County, Texas. There is one property listed on the National Register in the county.

Current listings 

|}

See also

National Register of Historic Places listings in Texas
Recorded Texas Historic Landmarks in Schleicher County

References

External links

Schleicher County, Texas
Schleicher County
Buildings and structures in Schleicher County, Texas